Bernhard Winkelheide (May 4, 1908 – November 25, 1988) was a German politician of the Christian Democratic Union (CDU) and former member of the German Bundestag.

Life 
He was a member of the German Bundestag from its first election in 1949 to 1972. In the Bundestag elections of 1949, 1953 and 1957 he won the direct mandate in the constituency of Recklinghausen-Stadt. In 1961, 1965 and 1969 he entered parliament via the state list of the CDU North Rhine-Westphalia.

Literature

References

1908 births
1988 deaths
Members of the Bundestag for North Rhine-Westphalia
Members of the Bundestag 1969–1972
Members of the Bundestag 1965–1969
Members of the Bundestag 1961–1965
Members of the Bundestag 1957–1961
Members of the Bundestag 1953–1957
Members of the Bundestag 1949–1953
Members of the Bundestag for the Christian Democratic Union of Germany